The Bukit Gombak Stadium is located in Bukit Batok, Singapore, and has a capacity of 3,000 people. The stadium was home to Gombak United FC in the S-league before they left the S-league in the year 2002. Thereafter, the stadium was converted to a Centre of Excellence for the Singapore Athletic Association.

It is adjacent to the Bukit Gombak MRT station.

References

Sports venues in Singapore
Football venues in Singapore
Athletics (track and field) venues in Singapore
Bukit Batok
Singapore Premier League venues
Gombak United FC